KTA Advocates (Formerly Karuhanga, Tabaro & Associates) is a Ugandan law firm headquartered in Kampala, the capital city of Uganda. It is a private legal practice firm founded in 2009.

Justus Karuhanga, the firm's founding senior partner, in particular has a high profile having acted as a legal advisor to the president of Uganda. Edgar Tabaro, the firm's business development partner, is the Justice and Constitutional Affairs minister of Toro Kingdom and also serves as a board member and legal brain for Uganda Communications Authority (UCA). Kenneth Muhangi, the firms Technology & Intellectual Property Partner, lectures cyber law & Intellectual Property, consults for the Ministry of ICT on Innovation & worked on the e-justice project of the Judiciary of Uganda.

The firm as a whole is active in intellectual property, media and telecommunications, broadcasting and IT.

Offices
 Kampala (2009)

Membership
 Uganda Law Society (ULS)
East African Law Society (EALS)
 Institute of Corporate Governance of Uganda
 Center for Arbitration and Dispute Resolution

History
KTA Advocates was established as a law firm and duly registered and certified by the Law Council of the Ugandan Ministry of Justice and Constitutional Affairs in 2009 by Justus Karuhanga, Edgar Tabaro and Edwin Tabaro. Since its inception, the Firm has handled a number of noteworthy transactions for multinational corporations, financial institutions, government and non-government organisations, corporations and related agencies, private businesses and individuals in Uganda and globally.

Notable Cases
Airtime dealers v Uganda Telecom

In 2010, KTA represented Ugandan airtime dealers, in a contentious matter in which they took Uganda Telecom to court for breach of distributorship agreements. The dealers then demanded for Shs15 billion ($6 million) for an out of court settlement.

Sylvia Nabiteeko Katende v Bank of Uganda

In 2010, KTA represented Nabiteeko, a senior lecturer at Makerere University, in a case in which she sued Bank of Uganda for using her artistic works on the Shs20,000 note without her consent. This particular suit was valued at Shs1 bn and above.

Elamin v Abu Dhabi Group & Others

In 2012, KTA represented Abdul Rahman Elamin in a case in which the Ugandan businessman sued the Abu Dhabi royal family's business entities over the three per cent shares allotted to him in Warid Telecom. The minority shareholder sued the firm, allegedly over unpaid shares which were then valued at $3.7 million.

Clients
Below are some of the firm's notable clients: 

Salah Khamas Group
Black Sea Group 
Uganda National Roads Authority (UNRA)
DTB
Uganda Communications Commission (UCC)
Diary Development Authority
National Information Technology Authority (NITA)
The King of Toro
Yoweri Museveni
DFCU Bank

Practice areas
KTA specializes in the following disciplines:

Intellectual Property, Trademark, Patents and Product Liability
 Mergers & Acquisitions (M & A)
Legal Process Outsourcing (LPOS)
Public-Private Partnerships
ICT & Telecoms 
 Energy & Mining (Extractive Industry, Electricity, Oil & Gas)
Anti Fraud
Corporate Finance, Capital Markets & Banking
Tax Law
International Humanitarian Law (IHL)
Alternative Dispute Resolution

Rankings
The 2014 IFLR1000's financial and corporate law firm rankings show that KTA is a financial and corporate law firm in Uganda.

See also
 Law Development Centre
 Uganda Law Society

References

Law firms of Uganda